Multinational Corps Northeast was formed on 18 September 1999 at Szczecin, Poland, which became its headquarters. It evolved from what was for many years the only multinational corps in NATO, Allied Land Forces Schleswig-Holstein and Jutland (LANDJUT) (in its turn, a part of Allied Forces Northern Europe). From 1962 LANDJUT had been responsible for the defence of the Baltic Approaches from a headquarters at Rendsburg, Germany. It comprised the 6th Panzergrenadier Division and the Danish Jutland Division.

History
A tri-national working group was established following the July 1997 decision that Poland was to be admitted to NATO with the aim of establishing the corps as part of NATO’s Main Defence Forces. Its missions are three-fold: to participate in the collective defence of NATO territory, under Article 5 of the North Atlantic Treaty, to contribute to multinational crisis management including peace support operations, and to provide command and control for humanitarian, rescue, and disaster relief operations.

In July 1997, Ministers of Defence of Denmark, Germany and Poland decided to establish a Danish-German-Polish Corps. This corps was to be named Multinational Corps Northeast with its headquarters located in Szczecin, Poland. The Headquarters Allied Land Forces Schleswig-Holstein and Jutland (LANDJUT) from Rendsburg in Germany was to form the nucleus of this new command. Ministers of Defence of Denmark, Germany and Poland signed the Corps Convention in 1998, when Poland was not a member of NATO yet, but the date of the country’s accession (12 March 1999) had already been set. On 18 September 1999, the three Framework Nations – Denmark, Germany, Poland – could hoist their flags in the Baltic Barracks, the seat of the Corps in Szczecin. The Corps has significantly developed decisively since that time.

Though it is a NATO-affiliated formation, the Corps Convention is a trilateral agreement between the three nations. The positions of commander, deputy commander, and chief of staff rotate between the three nations. For common purposes of practice and training the corps was assigned to Joint Sub-Regional Command Northeast (JSRC NE), at Karup, Denmark. For Article 5 common defence purposes, the Corps was to have been assigned either to JSRC NE or the JSRC Centre at Heidelberg, Germany. Following the latest reorganisation, it might report if designated for operations in Central Europe to Allied Force Command Heidelberg. The 14th Panzergrenadier Division of the German Army used to be part of the Corps, but disbanded at the end of 2008.

Due to its geographical location, the only NATO HQ East of the former Iron Curtain, Multinational Corps North East has a key function in the integration of new NATO member states. This is reflected in the structure of its personnel. Officers and NCO's from the Czech Republic, Estonia, Latvia, Lithuania and Slovakia are serving at Multinational Corps North East. Since April 2004, the flags of Estonia, Latvia and Lithuania have been fluttering at the Headquarters. In January 2005, Slovakia joined Multinational Corps Northeast, whereas the Czech Republic - in October 2005. The US flag was hoisted in November 2006 indicating the US membership in the Corps. In July 2008, first Romanian officers arrived to serve at the HQ. In August 2009, Slovenia entered the MNC NE family. In January 2012, Croatia officially became the twelfth nation of the Corps. In July 2013, the flag of Hungary was hoisted in Baltic Barracks. Sweden, a non-NATO member, sent its representative to the Baltic Barracks in autumn 2014. In 2015 Turkish, British, French and Dutch officers started their tours of duty in Szczecin. Canada, Iceland, Belgium, Norway and Greece joined the Corps in 2016.

In 2005, during the Compact Eagle exercise, the headquarters achieved full operational capability.

From January to August 2007 a considerable number of personnel from Multinational Corps Northeast were put at the disposal of International Security Assistance Force's headquarters in Kabul, Afghanistan.

On 5 February 2015, a trilateral statement by the Corps Convention countries stated, in part, that:
 'At the NATO Summit in September 2014 the Ministers of Defence from Germany, Poland and Denmark informed their colleagues and signed a statement that they had decided to raise the level of readiness of the Headquarters MNC NE from a Forces of Lower Readiness Headquarters to a High Readiness Force Headquarters and to enhance its capability to address future threats and challenges'.
 '..the level of readiness [of the corps will be raised] and fulfil a joint and regional role within the framework of NATO’s Readiness Action Plan, for both Assurance and Adaptation Measures in order to exercise command and control in the full range of Alliance missions in the north-eastern region (Estonia, Latvia, Lithuania and Poland) of the Alliance with the emphasis on Article 5 operations including command and control over the Very High Readiness Joint Task Force (VJTF). Additionally, MNC NE will execute command and control over the NATO Force Integration Units (NFIUs) in Estonia, Latvia, Lithuania and Poland.'

In June 2016, during the exercise Brilliant Capability 16 the Corps has become operationally capable to assume command of the Very High Readiness Joint Task Force, also referred to as the “spearhead force”.

Mission in Afghanistan 
The MNC NE staff formed part of the International Security Assistance Force (ISAF) during the War in Afghanistan (2001–2021).

MNC NE officially took over ISAF duties for the first time on 4 February 2007. Nearly 160 officers and non-commissioned officers spent over 6 month in Kabul. The majority of the MNC NE staff filled the posts in a newly established composite ISAF Headquarters in Kabul. From February to August 2010, the personnel of the Corps participated in the ISAF mission for the second time. The majority of approximately 130 officers and non-commissioned officers filled the posts at the ISAF Joint Command, a tactical level headquarters. Serving at different branches, they were gaining valuable mission experience and improving their skills. The third deployment with the participation of more than 120 soldiers from the Corps and partnering formations started in January 2014 and ended in January 2015. As soon as the ISAF mandate expired, the Resolute Support Mission commenced in January 2015.

Mission: International Security Assistance Force, Afghanistan
 February – August 2007
 February – August 2010
 January 2014 – January 2015

Affiliated Forces
HQ-Coy (Szczecin)
Command Support Brigade (HQ Szczecin)
12th Infantry Division (Poland) (HQ Szczecin)
2nd Legion Mechanized Brigade in Złocieniec
7th Coastal Defense Brigade in Słupsk
12th Mechanised Brigade in Szczecin
5th Artillery Regiment in Sulechów
8th Air Defence Regiment in Koszalin
12th Command Battalion in Szczecin
Multinational Division Northeast
Mechanised Infantry Brigade Iron Wolf 
NATO eFP Battlegroup Lithuania
15th Mechanised Brigade (Giżycko)
NATO eFP Battlegroup Poland
Multinational Division North
1st Infantry Brigade (Estonia) 
NATO eFP Battlegroup Estonia
Mechanised Infantry Brigade 
NATO eFP Battlegroup Latvia
NATO Force Integration Unit Estonia
NATO Force Integration Unit Latvia
NATO Force Integration Unit Lithuania
NATO Force Integration Unit Poland
NATO Force Integration Unit Slovakia
NATO Force Integration Unit Hungary

Commanders 
 1999-2001 –  LTG Henrik Ekmann
 Deputy Corps Commander –  MG Edward Pietrzyk (since 2000 BG Zdzisław Goral)
 Chief of Staff –  BG Joachim Sachau
 2001-2003 –  LTG Zygmunt Sadowski
 Deputy Corps Commander –  MG Rolf Schneider
 Chief of Staff –  BG Karl Nielsen
 2004-2006 –  LTG Egon Ramms
 Deputy Corps Commander –  MG Rolf Schneider (since 2004 MG Jan Andersen)
 Chief of Staff –  BG Karl Nielsen (since 2004 BG Henryk Skarżyński)
 2006-2009 –  LTG Zdzisław Goral
 Deputy Corps Commander –  MG Jan Andersen (since 2008 MG Ole Køppen)
 Chief of Staff –  BG Josef Heinrichs (since 2008 BG Josef Heinrichs)
 2009-2012 –  LTG Rainer Korff
 Deputy Corps Commander –  MG Ryszard Sorokosz (since 2012 MG Bogusław Samol)
 Chief of Staff –  BG Morten Danielsson
 2013-2015 –  LTG Bogusław Samol (since December 2012)
 Deputy Corps Commander –  BG Morten Danielsson (since May 2013 MG Agner Rokos)
 Chief of Staff –  BG Lutz Niemann
 2015-2018 –  LTG Manfred Hofmann
 Deputy Corps Commander –  BG Krzysztof Król (till January 2016 MG Agner Rokos)
 Chief of Staff –  BG Per Orluff Knudsen  (till January 2016 BG Lutz Niemann)
 2018-2021 –  LTG Sławomir Wojciechowski
 Deputy Corps Commander –  MG Ulrich Hellebjerg
 Chief of Staff –  BG Bogdan Rycerski
 2021 - present –  LTG Jürgen-Joachim von Sandrart
 Deputy Corps Commander –  MG Ulrich Hellebjerg
 Chief of Staff –   BG Bogdan Rycerski

References

External links 
Official website of Multinational Corps Northeast
Multinational Corps Northeast on Facebook
MNC NE on twitter
MNC NE on flickr
Official profile HQ MNC NE on YouTube
 

Army corps of the Bundeswehr
Corps of Poland
Army units and formations of Denmark
Military units and formations established in 1999
1999 establishments in Poland
Multinational army units and formations
NATO Rapid Deployable Corps